Giovanni Battista Ansaldo (died 1578) was a Roman Catholic prelate who served as Bishop of Cariati e Cerenzia (1576–1578).

Biography
On 24 October 1576, Giovanni Battista Ansaldo was appointed during the papacy of Pope Gregory XIII as Bishop of Cariati e Cerenzia. On 4 November 1576, he was consecrated bishop by Giulio Antonio Santorio, Cardinal-Priest of San Bartolomeo all'Isola, with Cesare de' Giacomelli, Bishop of Belcastro, and Gaspare Viviani, Bishop of Hierapetra et Sitia, serving as co-consecrators. He served as Bishop of Cariati e Cerenzia until his death in 1578.

See also 
Catholic Church in Italy

References

External links and additional sources
 (for Chronology of Bishops) 
 (for Chronology of Bishops) 

16th-century Italian Roman Catholic bishops
Bishops appointed by Pope Gregory XIII
1578 deaths